Robert Francis Morgan (June 28, 1930 – October 10, 1991) was an American football offensive tackle in the National Football League for the Washington Redskins.  He played college football and college lacrosse as a defenseman for the Maryland Terrapins at the University of Maryland and was drafted in the eighth round of the 1953 NFL Draft by the Los Angeles Rams.

Bob played several years in the Canadian Football League for the Calgary Stampeders.

He was a fixture in Washington, D.C., as food and beverage manager for the Hotel Continental.  He left that position to move west to Denver, taking over as food and beverage manager for the Denver Merchandise Mart, in 1977.

References

1930 births
1991 deaths
American football offensive tackles
Maryland Terrapins football players
Maryland Terrapins men's lacrosse players
Washington Redskins players
People from Armstrong County, Pennsylvania
Players of American football from Pennsylvania